Sanjeev Arora (born January 1968) is an Indian American theoretical computer scientist.

Life

He was a visiting scholar at the Institute for Advanced Study in 2002–03.

In 2008 he was inducted as a Fellow of the Association for Computing Machinery.
In 2011 he was awarded the ACM Infosys Foundation Award, given to mid-career researchers in Computer Science. Arora has been awarded the Fulkerson Prize for 2012 for his work on improving the approximation ratio for graph separators and related problems (jointly with Satish Rao and Umesh Vazirani). In 2012 he became a Simons Investigator. Arora was elected to the National Academy of Sciences on May 2, 2018.

He is a coauthor (with Boaz Barak) of the book Computational Complexity: A Modern Approach and is a founder, and on the Executive Board, of Princeton's Center for Computational Intractability. He and his coauthors have argued that certain financial products are associated with computational asymmetry, which under certain conditions may lead to market instability.

Books

References

External links
 Sanjeev Arora's Homepage
 Sanjeev Arora at the Mathematics Genealogy Project

1968 births
Living people
Theoretical computer scientists
20th-century Indian mathematicians
20th-century American mathematicians
Institute for Advanced Study visiting scholars
Gödel Prize laureates
Punjabi people
Princeton University faculty
Fellows of the American Academy of Arts and Sciences
Scientists from Rajasthan
People from Jodhpur
21st-century Indian mathematicians
Simons Investigator
Recipients of the ACM Prize in Computing
Members of the United States National Academy of Sciences
21st-century American mathematicians
American people of Indian descent